James Joseph Reeb (January 1, 1927 – March 11, 1965) was an American Unitarian Universalist minister, pastor, and activist during the civil rights movement in Washington, D.C. and Boston, Massachusetts. While participating in the Selma to Montgomery marches actions in Selma, Alabama, in 1965, he was murdered by white segregationists, dying of head injuries in the hospital two days after being severely beaten. Three men were tried for Reeb's murder but were acquitted by an all-white jury. His murder remains officially unsolved.

Life and career
Reeb was born on January 1, 1927, in Wichita, Kansas, to Mae (Fox) and Harry Reeb. He was raised in Kansas and Casper, Wyoming.  He attended Natrona County High School and graduated in 1945, after which he joined the Army despite the fact that his commitment to the ministry made him exempt from service. After basic training, he was sent to Anchorage, Alaska, as a clerk typist for the headquarters of Special Troops. He was honorably discharged eighteen months later in December 1946 as Technical Sergeant, Third Class. After his time in the Army, Reeb continued his schooling. Initially, he attended classes in his home town at Casper Junior College, before moving on to St. Olaf College, in 1947, where he received his A.B. cum laude in 1950. He then entered Princeton Theological Seminary in Princeton, New Jersey, where he earned his B.D. in 1953. Three days later, Reeb was ordained a Presbyterian minister at the First Presbyterian Church of Casper. After this he accepted a position at the Philadelphia General Hospital as Chaplain to Hospitals for the Philadelphia Presbyter. To become a more effective counselor, he went back to school, enrolling at Conwell School of Theology, where he earned an S.T.M. in Pastoral Counseling in 1955.

As a scholar of theology, Reeb grew away from traditionalist Presbyterian teachings and was drawn to the Unitarian Universalist church. In March 1957, he resigned his Presbyterian Chaplaincy and contacted the American Unitarian Association about transferring his fellowship from Presbyterian to Unitarian. Reeb appreciated the church's emphasis on social action, and he became active in the civil rights movement during the 1960s.

Beginning in his new ministry, Reeb encouraged parishioners to participate in the movement as well. With his wife and four children, he lived in poor black neighborhoods where he felt he could do the most good. He took a job that would allow him to work closely with Philadelphia's poor community as a youth director for the West Branch Y.M.C.A. between 1957 and 1959. While at the Y.M.C.A. he abolished the racial quota system and started an integrated busing program to transport youth to and from the location. When he was granted preliminary fellowship by the Unitarians, he accepted an offer to be assistant minister of All Souls Church in Washington D.C. After three years of active service at All Souls Church, Reeb was fully ordained as a Unitarian Universalist minister in 1962.  In 1964, he began as community relations director for the American Friends Service Committee's Boston Metropolitan Housing Program, focusing on desegregation. At the AFSC, Reeb and his staff advocated for the poor and pressed the city to enforce its housing code, protecting the rights of tenants of all races and backgrounds, particularly poor African and Hispanic Americans. The Reebs were one of the few white families living in Roxbury. James Reeb's daughter Anne recollected that her father "was adamant that you could not make a difference for African-Americans while living comfortable in a white community."

Reeb married Marie Deason on August 20, 1950; they had four children.

Murder

As a member of the Southern Christian Leadership Conference (SCLC), Reeb went to Selma to join the Selma to Montgomery marches, a series of protests for African-American voting rights that followed the murder of Jimmie Lee Jackson in Marion, Ala., by a law enforcement officer. Reeb was prompted by the Bloody Sunday attack by state troopers and sheriff's deputies on nonviolent demonstrators on March 7, 1965. After eating dinner at an integrated restaurant on March 9, Reeb and two other Unitarian ministers, Rev. Clark Olsen and Rev. Orloff Miller  were attacked by white men with clubs for their support of African-American rights. The black hospital in Selma did not have the facilities to treat him. Two hours elapsed, and his condition deteriorated, before Reeb arrived at a Birmingham hospital — treatment was not available for him in much closer Montgomery — where doctors performed brain surgery. While Reeb was on his way to the hospital in Birmingham, civil rights leader Martin Luther King Jr. addressed a press conference lamenting the "cowardly" attack and asking all to pray for his protection. Reeb went into a coma and died two days later from his injuries.

Little notice had been taken by the national press of the killing of Jimmie Lee Jackson. But Reeb's death resulted in a national outcry against the activities of white racists in the Deep South. Tens of thousands held vigils in his honor. President Lyndon B. Johnson called Reeb's widow and father to express his condolences, and on March 15 invoked Reeb's memory when he delivered a draft of the Voting Rights Act to Congress.  The same day, King eulogized Reeb at a ceremony at Brown's Chapel in Selma: "James Reeb symbolizes the forces of good will in our nation. He demonstrated the conscience of the nation. He was  an attorney for the defense of the innocent in the court of world opinion. He was a witness to the truth that men of different races and classes might live, eat, and work together as brothers." And, King said, "James Reeb says something to each of us, black and white alike—says that we must substitute courage for caution, says to us that we must be concerned not merely about who murdered him but about the system, the way of life."

White supremacists in Alabama, however, reacted differently and tried to gaslight public understanding of how Reeb died. Selma Sheriff Jim Clark falsely stated in an open letter he wrote and distributed that Reeb, whom he identified as the "so-called minister," died after being "thrown out of one beer joint (then) coming out of another when he and his companions had a fight or were beaten by some men." Selma business leaders circulated printed material that falsely claimed Reeb had suffered only a minor injury in Selma and was subsequently killed by civil rights workers who crushed his skull out on a dark road.

The Voting Rights Act was passed on August 6, 1965.

In April 1965, four men - Elmer Cook, William Stanley Hoggle, Namon O'Neal Hoggle, and R.B. Kelley - were indicted in Dallas County, Alabama, for Reeb's murder; three were acquitted after less than 90 minutes of deliberation by an all-white jury that December. The fourth man fled to Mississippi and was not returned by the state authorities for trial.

In July 2007, The Boston Globe reported that the FBI's Cold Case Initiative had reopened the investigation into the 46-year-old case. The renewed investigation was also reported by The Anniston Star and The Clarion-Ledger of Jackson, Mississippi. However, in 2011 the case was closed again, and no charges were pursued. According to the U.S. Department of Justice, the decision to close the case was made upon discovery that three of the four men believed to be responsible for the killing were deceased and that Namon Hoggle, the only surviving individual, was tried and acquitted of the crime in state court, barring him from further prosecution. Namon Hoggle died five years later on August 31, 2016, at age 81.

National Public Radio investigation 
NPR investigative journalists Andrew Beck Grace and Chip Brantley presented the findings of a multi-year investigation in a podcast, White Lies, which aired in May and June 2019. During their investigation Grace and Brantley found an eyewitness, Frances Bowden, and a fourth man, William Portwood, who was involved in the crime. Portwood had not previously been identified.

Grace and Brantley interviewed William Portwood in 2017. At that time, Portwood had suffered from strokes and was experiencing memory lapses. However, he was able to remember having been there. "All I did was kick one of them" Portwood said.

Frances Bowden is the proprietor of Selma Bail Bonds, which was located adjacent to the crime scene. After the death of Namon (Duck) Hoggle, and learning that William Portwood had admitted to being involved, Bowden gave an account of what she saw that night from the window of her business. In summary, she stated that Elmer Cook, William Stanley Hoggle, Duck Hoggle, and William Portwood assaulted Reverends Reeb, Olsen, and Miller. It was Elmer Cook who swung the club and struck Reverend Reeb.

William Portwood died shortly after his last interview with NPR on September 30, 2017.

Media portrayals
Reeb is portrayed by Jeremy Strong in the film Selma (2014).

See also

Viola Liuzzo
List of unsolved murders

References

External links
 Martin Luther King Jr.’s "Eulogy for James Reeb", Unitarian Universalist World
 "Interview with two Reeb children, who talk about their father's effect on the Civil Rights Movement", HMB Review, 12 November 2008
 
 "James Reeb", Harvard Square Library
 Reeb, James (1927-1965)" Martin Luther King Jr.: and the Global Freedom Struggle. 
 
 "The Rev. Clark Olsen's memories of the murder of Jim Reeb in Selma in 1965." Unitarian Universalist World
 "James Reeb" The King Center
 "Clark Olsen still weeps over killing of fellow minister" March 11, 2011, in Unpunished killings, by Jerry Mitchell
 "James Reeb" Jim Crow Museum of Racist Memorabilia. Ferris State University
 "Dr. King Leads March at Selma; State Police End It Peaceably"  The New York Times on the web
 "Who was James Reeb?" James Reeb Unitarian Universalist Congregation
 Touched by their family history, Rev. James Reeb's granddaughters Leah Reeb and Corrie Lubenow have traveled to Selma to better understand his convictions and his sacrifice" Made in Wyoming: Our Legacy of Success.
 

1927 births
1965 deaths
1965 murders in the United States
20th-century Christian clergy
20th-century American clergy
Activists for African-American civil rights
United States Army personnel of World War II
American Unitarian clergy
American Unitarian Universalists
Assassinated American civil rights activists
Clergy from Boston
Deaths by beating in the United States
Lynching deaths in Alabama
People from Wichita, Kansas
People murdered in Alabama
Princeton Theological Seminary alumni
Selma to Montgomery marches
St. Olaf College alumni
Unitarian Universalist clergy
Unsolved murders in the United States
United States Army soldiers